Bremazocine is a κ-opioid receptor agonist related to pentazocine. It has potent and long-lasting analgesic and diuretic effects. It has 200 times the activity of morphine, but appears to have no addictive properties and does not depress breathing. The crystal structure of bremazocine was determined in 1984

See also 
 Benzomorphan

References 

Synthetic opioids
Phenols
Benzomorphans
Kappa-opioid receptor agonists
Tertiary alcohols
Cyclopropanes